The Adil Shahi or Adilshahi, was a Shia, and later Sunni Muslim, dynasty founded by Yusuf Adil Shah, that ruled the Sultanate of Bijapur, centred on present-day Bijapur district, Karnataka in India, in the Western area of the Deccan region of Southern India from 1489 to 1686. Bijapur had been a province of the Bahmani Sultanate (1347–1518), before its political decline in the last quarter of the 15th century and eventual break-up in 1518. The Bijapur Sultanate was absorbed into the Mughal Empire on 12 September 1686, after its conquest by the Emperor Aurangzeb.

The founder of the dynasty, Yusuf Adil Shah (1490–1510), was appointed Bahmani governor of the province, before creating a de facto independent Bijapur state. Yusuf and his son, Ismail, generally used the title Adil Khan. 'Khan', meaning 'Chief' in various Central Asian cultures and adopted in Persian, conferred a lower status than 'Shah', indicating royal rank. Only with the rule of Yusuf's grandson, Ibrahim Adil Shah I (1534–1558), did the title of Adil Shah come into common use. Even then, Bijapur rulers recognized Safavid Persian suzerainty over their realm.

The Bijapur Sultanate's borders changed considerably throughout its history. Its northern boundary remained relatively stable, straddling contemporary Southern Maharashtra and Northern Karnataka. The Sultanate expanded southward, first with the conquest of the Raichur Doab following the defeat of the Vijayanagara empire at the Battle of Talikota in 1565. Later campaigns, notably during the reign of Mohammed Adil Shah (1627–1657), extended Bijapur's formal borders and nominal authority as far south as Bangalore. Bijapur was bounded on the West by the Portuguese state of Goa and on the East by the Sultanate of Golconda, ruled by the Qutb Shahi dynasty.

The former Bahmani provincial capital of Bijapur remained the capital of the Sultanate throughout its existence. After modest earlier developments, Ibrahim Adil Shah I (1534–1558) and Ali Adil Shah I (1558–1579) remodelled Bijapur, providing the citadel and city walls, congregational mosque, core royal palaces and major water supply infrastructure. Their successors, Ibrahim Adil Shah II (1580–1627), Mohammed Adil Shah (1627–1657) and Ali Adil Shah II (1657–1672), further adorned Bijapur with palaces, mosques, mausoleum and other structures, considered to be some of the finest examples of Deccan Sultanate and Indo-Islamic Architecture.

Bijapur was caught up in the instability and conflict resulting from the collapse of the Bahmani Empire. Constant warring, both with the Vijayanagara Empire and the other Deccan Sultanates, curtailed the development of state before the Deccan Sultanates allied to achieve victory over Vijayanagara at Talikota in 1565. Bijapur eventually conquered the neighbouring Sultanate of Bidar in 1619. The Portuguese Empire exerted pressure on the major Adil Shahi port of Goa, until it was conquered during the reign of Ibrahim II. The Sultanate was thereafter relatively stable, although it was damaged by the revolt of Shivaji, whose father was Maratha commander in the service of Adil Shah. Shivaji founded an independent Maratha Kingdom which went on to become the Maratha Empire, one of the largest empires in India, just before the British conquered India. The greatest threat to Bijapur's security was, from the late 16th century, the expansion of the Mughal Empire into the Deccan. Although it may be the case that the Mughals destroyed the Adilshahi, it was Shivaji's revolt which weakened the Adilshahi control. Various agreements and treaties imposed Mughal suzerainty on the Adil Shahs, by stages, until Bijapur's formal recognition of Mughal authority in 1636. The demands of their Mughal overlords sapped the Adil Shahs of their wealth until the Mughal conquest of Bijapur in 1686.

Historical overview

 

The founder of the dynasty, Yusuf Adil Shah, may have been a Georgian slave who was purchased by Mahmud Gawan from Iran. Yet, Salma Ahmed Farooqui, states, Yusuf was a son of the Ottoman Sultan Murad II. According to the historian Mir Rafi-uddin Ibrahim-i Shirazi, or Rafi''', Yusuf's full name was Sultan Yusuf 'Adil Shah Savah or Sawah'i (from the ancient town of Saveh, southwest of modern Tehran), the son of Mahmud Beg of Sawa in Iran, (Rafi' 36–38, vide Devare 67, fn 2). Rafi's history of the 'Adil Shahi dynasty was written at the request of Ibrahim Adil Shah II, and was completed and presented to the patron in AH 1017. The Indian scholar T.N. Devare mentioned that while Rafi's account of the Bahmani dynasty is filled with anachronisms, his account of the Adilshahi is "fairly accurate, exhaustive, and possesses such rich and valuable information about Ali I and Ibrahim II" (312). Rafi-uddin later became the governor of Bijapur for about 15 years (Devare 316).

Yusuf's bravery and personality raised him rapidly in Sultan's favour, resulting in his appointment as the Governor of Bijapur. He built the Citadel or Arkilla and the Faroukh Mahal. Yusuf was a man of culture. He invited poets and artisans from Persia, Turkey, and Rome to his court. He's well known as a ruler who took advantage of the decline of the Bahmani power to establish himself as an independent sultan at Bijapur in 1498. He did this with a military support which has been given to him by a Bijapuri general Kalidas Madhu Sadhwani – brilliant commander and good diplomat, who made quick career by supporting Yusuf Adil Shah and then his son – Ismail Adil Shah. He married Punji, the sister of a Maratha Raja of Indapur. When Yusuf died in 1510, his son Ismail was still a boy. Punji in male attire valiantly defended him from a coup to grab the throne. Ismail Adil Shah thus became the ruler of Bijapur and succeeded his father's ambition.

Ibrahim Adil Shah I who succeeded his father Ismail, fortified the city and built the old Jamia Masjid. Ali Adil Shah I who next ascended the throne, aligned his forces with other Muslim kings of Golconda, Ahmednagar and Bidar, and together, they brought down the Vijayanagara empire. With the loot gained, he launched ambitious projects. He built the Gagan Mahal, the Ali Rauza (his own tomb), Chand Bawdi (a large well) and the Jami Masjid. Ali I had no son, so his nephew Ibrahim II was set on the throne. Ali I's queen Chand Bibi had to aid him until he came of age. Ibrahim II was noted for his valor, intelligence and leanings towards the Hindu music and philosophy. Under his patronage the Bijapur school of painting reached its zenith. Muhammad Adil Shah succeeded his father Ibrahim II. He is renowned for Bijapur's grandest structure, the Gol Gumbaz, which has the biggest dome in the world with whispering gallery round about slightest sound is reproduced seven times. He also set up the historical Malik-e-Maidan, the massive gun.

Ali Adil Shah II inherited a troubled kingdom. He had to face the onslaught of the Maratha leader Shivaji on one side and Mughal emperor Aurangzeb on another. His mausoleum, Bara Kaman, planned to dwarf all others, was left unfinished due to his death. Sikandar Adil Shah, the last Adil Shahi sultan, ruled next for fourteen stormy years. Finally on 12 September 1686, the Mughal armies under Aurangzeb overpowered the city of Bijapur.

Sufis of Bijapur
Arrival of Sufis in Bijapur region was started during the reign of Qutbuddin Aibak. During this period Deccan region was under the control of native Hindu rulers and Palegars. Shaikh Haji Roomi was the first to arrive in Bijapur with his companions. Although his other comrades like Shaikh Salahuddin, Shaikh Saiful Mulk and Syed Haji Makki were settled in Pune, Haidra and Tikota respectively.

According to Tazkiraye Auliyae Dakkan i.e., Biographies of the saints of the Deccan, compiled by Abdul Jabbar Mulkapuri in 1912–1913, 

After this period arrival of Sufis in Bijapur and suburbs was started. Ainuddin Gahjul Ilm Dehelvi narrates that Ibrahim Sangane was one of the early Sufis of Bijapur parish.  Sufis of Bijapur can be divided into three categories according to period of their arrival viz., Sufis before Bahmani and/or Adil Shahi Dynasty, Sufis during Adil Shahi Dynasty and Sufis after the fall of Adil Shahi Dynasty. And further, it can be classified as Sufis as warriors, Sufis as social reformers, Sufis as scholars, poets and writers.

Ibrahim Zubairi writes in his book Rouzatul Auliyae Beejapore (compiled during 1895) which describes that more than 30 tombs or Dargahs are there in Bijapur with more than 300 Khankahs  i.e., Islamic Missionary Schools with notable number of disciples of different lineage like Hasani Sadat, Husaini Sadat, Razavi Sadat, Kazmi Sadat, Shaikh Siddiquis, Farooquis, Usmanis, Alvis, Abbasees  and other and spiritual chains like Quadari, Chishti, Suharwardi, Naqshbandi, Shuttari, Haidari  etc.

Bijapur: The Great Metropolis of the Medieval Deccan Region

In the second half of the 16th century, and the 17th century under the aegis of Adil Shahis, the capital city of Bijapur occupied a prominent place among the celebrated cities of India. It was a great centre of culture, trade and commerce, education and learning, etc. It was known for its own culture called, Bijapur Culture.  During Bijapur's heyday of glory there was a conflux of different communities and the people. Sometimes in many respects it surpassed the great cities of Delhi and Agra of Mughal India.
Before Yusuf Adil Shah, the founder of the Adil Shahis could make Bijapur as capital of his newly carved kingdom; the town occupied a considerable importance. The Khaljis made Bijapur their governor's seat, and after some time Khwajah Mahmud Gawan, the Bahmani premier constituted Bijapur region into a separate province. He owned property in Bijapur called "Kala Bagh". He constructed a mausoleum of Ain-ud-Din Ganj-ul-'ullum. The architecture of the mausoleums of Zia-ud-Din Ghaznavi, Hafiz Husseini and Hamzah Husseini etc. suggests that these edifices belong to the Bahmani period.
Thus Bijapur was fairly large town under the early Sultans of Adil Shahi dynasty. The capital progressed slowly, however, its star was in ascendancy since the accession of Sultan Ali Adil Shah I in 1558. His victory in the Battle of Talikota in 1565 and further campaigns in the Krishna-Tunghabhadra regions brought enormous wealth. Hence he began to spend lavishly on its decoration. Under him every year saw some new building, a palace, a mosque, a bastion, or a minaret. His successor Ibrahim Adil Shah II added, so to say, a pearl necklace, Ibrahim Rouza to enhance the beauty of Bijapur, and Mohammed Adil Shah crowned it with a priceless gem called Gol Gumbaz. Thus the Adil Shahi monarchs poured their heart and soul in the capital city. The period between accessions of Ali Adil Shah I 1558 to the death of Mohammed Adil Shah 1656, can be called the golden age of the Adil Shahis as the kingdom flourished in all walks of life.

Population and Suburbs

During the reign of Ibrahim Adil Shah II the population of Bijapur is stated to have reached 984,000 and had an incredible total of 1,600 mosques. Under Mohammed Adil Shah the population further increased. Historian J. D. B. Gribble writes 

 Water system 

The Adil Shahi Sultans made an elaborate arrangement of pure and wholesome water for the people of Bijapur and its suburbs. At Torvi a masonry dam was constructed. We find another dam in its far eastern side. These two dams fed the reservoirs of Torvi and Afzalpur. Through these works, water was supplied to the suburbs of Shahpur, and the capital. Historian C. Schweitzer is of the opinion that the Torvi aqueduct is in itself a very credible engineering achievement of Adil Shahis. To augment the existing water supply in the city Mohammed Adil Shah constructed Jahan Begum Lake (Begum Talab) in the south of Bijapur. This Lake fed the southern and eastern sides of the city. Thus water reached every comer of the capital. In addition, to supplement the water needs of the people in and around, the Sultans and nobles constructed big and small wells. Captain Sykes who visited Bijapur in 1819 reports, there were 700 wells (Boudis) with steps and 300 wells (Kuans or small wells) without steps within the walls of Bijapur. Moreover, we find the remains of tanks and lakes named Rangrez Talab, Quasim Talab, Fatehpur Talab and Allahpur Talab in the vicinity of Bijapur.

Begum Talab, which is  tank was constructed in 1651 by Mohammad Adil Shah in memory of Jahan Begum. 
This tank was used for ensuring drinking water supply to the city. To the right side of lake there is an underground room from where water was supplied to city in earthen pipes. Many towers of height  to  called as "gunj" were built to release pressure of water and prevent pipes from bursting all along. These towers allowed dirt in pipes to remain at the bottom and clear water to flow.

Bazaars and Petes
Bijapur being the capital and big business centre attracted merchants and travellers in large number from the Deccan and many parts of India and foreign lands. Abdal, a court poet in his Ibrahim Namah writes,
  
The following market places were established respectively by the Adil Shahi Sultans in and around Bijapur.
Yusuf Adil Shah: Markovi Bazar, Thana Bazar, Naghthana Bazar, Daulat Bazar, Dahan Khan Bazar, Markur Bazar, Murad Khan Bazar, Palah Bazar, Mubarak Bazar and. Shahpeth (old) Bazar.
Ismail Adil Shah: Kamal Khan Bazar, NakaBazar and Bare-Khudavand Bazar.
Ibrahim Adil Shah I: Jagate Bazar, Roa Bazar, Sher Karkhana Bazar, Rangeen Masjid Bazar, Fateh Zaman Bazar, Karanzah Bazar, Sara Bazar, and ShikarKhan Bazar
Ali Adil Shah I: Jumma Masjid Bazar, SikandarBazar, FarhadKhan Bazar, Dilir Khan Bazar and Haidar Bazar.
Mohammed Adil Shah: Padshahpur Bazar.
Ali Adil Shah II: Shahpeth (new) Bazar.
Others: Ikhlas Khan Bazar, Yusuf Rumi Khan Bazar, Shah Abu Turab Bazar, Abdur Razzaq Bazar, Langar Bazar, Mahmood Shah Bazar, etc.
We found suburban markets called the Peths in the vicinity of Bijapur. They are as follows: Habibpur Peth, Salabatpur Beth, Tahwarpur Peth, Zohrapur Peth, Afzalpur Peth (Takiyah), Shahpur or Khudanpur or Khudawandpur Peth, Danatpur Peth, Sikandarpur Peth, Quadhpur Peth, Khwaspur Peth, Imampur Peth, Kumutagi Peth, etc.

Foreign accounts
From different parts of world many envoys, merchants, travellers, etc. visited Bijapur in its heyday of magnanimity and grandeur, and they left behind their valuable accounts of past grandiosities of Bijapur.
In 1013 corresponding to (1604–1605) the Mughal Emperor Akbar, commissioner Mirza Asad Baig, one of grandees of his court to Bijapur for diplomatic dealings. He was a person who saw Agra and Delhi in their glorious days. He wrote his account called, "Haalat-e-Asad Baig or Wakiat-e-Asad Baig". From his account we shall be able to form some idea of the position which Bijapur occupied among the wonder cities of India in the Medieval Ages. He cites in his impression of the city the grandeurs of the Adil Shahi court and its customs:

Mirza Asad Baig left Bijapur on 24 January 1604. His graphic account of Bijapur tells us how this city was prosperous, rich and flourishing.
Another traveller Manctelslo, who visited the Deccan area in 1638 writes, 

Similarly, Jean Baptiste Tavernier, who visited India between 1631 and 1667, was a jeweller, probably he had been to Bijapur for selling some of his jewels. He has left for us an account, in which he describes Bijapur was a great city ... in its large suburbs many goldsmiths and jewellers dwelt ... the king's palace (Arkillah or citadel) was vast, but ill-built and the access to it was very dangerous as the ditch with which it was girt was full of crocodiles,. in the same way, the Dutch traveller, Baldeous, the English geographer, Ogilby and others praise the greatness of Bijapur.

Gardens and Water Pavilions
The Adil Shahi Sultans were fond of gardens, water pavilions and resorts; hence they beautified Bijapur by presence of such amusing spots. Rafiuddin Shirazi writes in his ‘’"Tazkiratul-Mulk"’’ that during the rule of Ibrahim Adil Shah I a garden 60 yards long and 60 yards broad, was laid within the outer ‘'Hissar'’ (i.e., Arbah) and another 20 yards long and 20 yards broad, within the inner one (i.e., Arkilla Wall or citadel) was constructed. In the reign of Ali Adil Shah I, many trees of fruits viz. odoriferous orange, date, grapes, pomegranate, figs, apple. ‘'Naar'’ (quince-like fruit), etc. brought from the countries of hot and cold climates were set in gardens. From different historical sources we get references of gardens like Kishwar Khan Bagh, Ali Bagh, Dou-az-Deh (twelve) Imam Bagh, Alavi Bagh, Arkillah Bagh, Nauroz Bagh, Ibrahim Bagh, Murari Bagh, Naginah Bagh, etc. in Bijapur.
In southern side in the capital, a renowned Adil Shahi noble, Mubarak Khan constructed water pavilions and resort. Likewise, at Kumatagi village, about 12 miles in the east of Bijapur, the Sultans laid the water pavilions and resort for royal members.

Education and Learning

Before the Muslims could establish their rule in Bijapur, it was a great centre of learning in South India. It is evident from the bilingual Marathi–Sanskrit inscription, which is inscribed just under the Persian epigraph in the Karimuddin mosque 16 that the city of Bijapur is given the title of ‘’"Banaras of the South"’’. Since ancient time Banaras in northern India was a celebrated centre of learning. The Khaiji governor of Bijapur, Malik Karimuddin, probably found at this place the great activities of learning; hence he entitled Bijapur as the Banaras of the South. The Khaljis conquered whole south India and they were well acquainted with its famous cities like Daulatabad of Yadavas, Warangal of Kakatiyas, Dwarasamudra of Hoysalas and Madurai of Pandyas. However, they did not entitle any of these cities as the Banaras of the South, except Bijapur, though these cities were the capitals of ruling dynasties.
During the rule of Bahmanis Bijapur retained its academic excellence. The renowned learned Sufi of India, Ainuddin Ganjuloom Junnaidi, who authored 125 works of Qur’anic commentaries, Quirat (art of Quranic recitation), Hadith (prophetic Traditions), Scholasticism, Principles of Law, Fique (Islamic Law), Suluk (behavior). Syntax, Lexicography, Ansaab (genealogy). History, Tibb (medicine), Hilmat, Sanf (grammaIj), Quasidah, etc. lived in from 1371, until his death in 1390. His disciple and other Sufis like Ibrahim Sangani and his sons, Abdullah AI-Ghazani, Ziauddin Ghazanavi and Shah Hamzah Hussaini kept their noble litterateur's traditions alive in Bijapur.
Under the aegis of Adil Shahis of Bijapur advanced very much in the field of learning. It was considered as the 'Second Baghdad' in scholastic activities in the Islamic world. Owing to its popularity in this sphere Ibrahim Adil Shah II named it ‘’”Vidhyapur" All Sultans of Bijapur were men of letters. Ali Adil Shah I was well versed in religion, logic, sciences, syntax, etymology and grammar. He was fond of reading to the extent that he kept with him big boxes of books, while on tour. All Sultans patronised the teachers and scholars. It was routine in the capital that the scholars met at different places, and among them learned discussions were held.
At the capital the Royal Library existed in which nearly sixty men, calligraphers, gilders of books, book binders and illuminators were busy doing their work whole day in the library. Sesh Waman Pandit was the Royal Librarian. Ibrahim-II's court poet Baqir Khurd-e-Kasm worked as transcriber in the Royal Library.
The noted scholars in the capital were Shah Nawaz Khan, Abdul Rasheed-al-Bastagi, Shah Sibagatullah Hussaini, Shaikh Alimullah Muhaddis (a teacher of Sayings or Traditions of Muhummad, and Theology in Jumma mosque), Mullan Hassan Faraghi, MullanHabibullah, Shah Mohummad Mulki and Shah Habibullah Hussaini. Shah Zayn Muqbil, a great lover of learning and books, had eight hundred manuscripts in his library, out of these over three hundred were written by him. Miran Mohummad Mudarris Hussaini was also a great teacher.
At the Asar Mahal there were two Madrasas (religious schools), one for teaching Hadith (Tradition) and another for Fiqah and Imaan (Theology and Belief). Free education with delicious food, and stipend of one Hun to each student was provided. The Mosques had the Maktabs (elementary schools) where Arabic and Persian studies were taught. The state supplied books free of costs. The students who performed excellently in the annual examination, received prizes in Huns, and later appointed in high and honourable position. Besides these, most of the Sufis maintained their own Khankhas (convents for disciples) and Kutub Khanas (libraries). Even to this day some of the descendants of Sufis in perpetuity continued this tradition.
In consequence of state patronage, a bulk of literature in Arabic, Persian and Dakhani Urdu had come up. In addition, the languages like Sanskrit, Marathi and Kannada flourished. Pandit Narhari, a court poet of Ibrahim Adil Shah II, composed the poetic excellence on his master, called, Nauras Manzarf. Shri Laxmipathi, a disciple of Pandit Rukmangada composed a number of Marathi and Hindi devotional songs set in musical Ragas. Swamy Yadvendra was also a prominent contributor in Marathi literature. In the south of kingdom, the official transaction was carried out in Kannada.

Medical Aids and Darush-Shafa (Hospitals)

Dr. Zaman Khodaey says, in the kingdom of Bijapur the medical aids and Darush-Shafa existed. In the hospitals the different Departments dealt and treated different fevers, eye and ear problems, skin and other diseases.
We have references that in the kingdom the physicians practised the Unani, Ayurvedic, Irani and European systems of medicine. Hakim Gilani and Farnalope Firangi, a European physician and surgeon worked under Ibrahim Adil Shah II. Farnalope treated his ailing patron wrongly, which caused Sultan's death. Khawas Khan caught him, and as a punishment his nose and lips were cut off. Nothing daunted, Fanalope returned to his home and cut off the nose and lips of one of his slaves, and so fastened the same to his own that he was soon cured even of scars. He lived long in Bijapur and resumed his practice with great success. Aithippa, an Ayurvedic physician, who was attached to a dispensary at Bijapur compiled for his son Champa, Tibb-e-Bahri-o-Barri, a treatise on medicine. It contains a short vocabulary of some parts of the human body and some drugs with their equivalent in Arabic and Urdu. It further contains hints as to the examination of patients and symptoms and treatment of diseases. He had spent a long time attending upon and getting instruction from Hakim Mohummad Hussain Unani and Hakim Mohammad Masum Isfahani. The great historian Firishta was an expert Ayurvedic physician. He studied this system under Hakim-e-Misri and other Hindu physicians. After attaining proficiency, he started his own dispensary and prepared patent drugs and popular medicines. He possessed a great knowledge of Sanskrit, hence studied thoroughly works of Ayurveda like the Samhitas of Wagbhat, Charak and Sushrut, and wrote Dastur-e- Attibba or Iktiyarat-e-Qasmi. In this book, he mentioned the names of famous Ayurvedic physicians like Jagdeva, Sagarbhat and Sawa Pandit. He cites in the names of various diseases, herbs and drugs and also discusses simple and compound medicines and formulae of their preparation. The book is fairly comprehensive as its scope extends to anatomy, physiology and therapy. It seems Firishta was an expert in Botany as well. He gave details of minutes regarding characteristics of medicinal herbs, plants and fruits of India. Another physician Hakim Rukna-e-Maish skilled in medicine stayed in the court of Ibrahim Adil Shah II for some time before he joined the Mughals. At the instance of the same Sultan; Yunus Beg completed Kitab-e-TIbb, a work on medicine. The court poet of Mohammed Adil Shah, Hakim Aatishi possessed a unique skill in medicine and served as the Royal Physician. He was a personal physician of the Sultan, without his permission he could not attend other patients. With permission once he cured Khan-e-Khanan Ikhlas Khan. Aatishi took this onerous duty only when other physicians altogether failed. By his miraculous treatment patients recovered within three weeks.
Thus the Adil Shahi Sultans and the nobles never overlooked the medical services and always encouraged the physicians giving them handsome rewards. It because of such encouragement some of the physicians produced literature on medicine.

Abode of Music
The Adil Shahi monarchs were great lovers of music; some of them attained high order. Yusuf Adil Shah played ‘'Tambur'’(Tambourine) and ‘'Ud'’ (lute). Ismail Adil Shah had high admiration for Central Asian music. Music received greater encouragement under Ibrahim Adil Shah II. He was the greatest musician of his age. He was poet and singer and maintained an inordinately a large number of musicians and minstrels (three or four thousand) at his court. The band of musicians was known as Lashkar-e-Nauras (army of Nauras) they were paid by the government regularly. At Nauraspur he constructed Sangeet Mahal and residential mansions for songsters, minstrels and dancing girls. With great pomp the festival of Nauras (musical concert) was celebrated during his time. In a number of paintings Ibrahim Adil Shah II was depicted playing musical instruments like ‘'Tambur'’, ‘'Sitar'’, ‘'Veena'’ and ‘'Guitar'’. Emperor Jahangir, and Mirza Asad Baig the Mughal envoy considerably praised Ibrahim Adil Shah II's love for music.
Mirza Asad Baig writes in his ‘'Wakiyat'’ that he was invited to the royal palace to bid farewell to Ibrahim Adil Shah II

Art and architecture
The Adil Shahi Sultans had concentrated their energies almost exclusively on architecture and the allied arts, each Sultan endeavouring to excel his predecessor in the number, size, or splendor of his building projects. 
The architecture of Bijapur is a combination of Persian, Ottoman Turkish and Deccani styles. It is amazing to note mat in Ibrahim Rouzah, Dilkusha Mahal (Mahatar Mahal), Malikah-e-Jahan Mosque, Jal Mahal, etc. the Bijapur sculptors have carved beautiful designs in stones, as the carpenters do in wood. The stucco plaster designing in some monuments is superb.

Adil Shahi arts and heritage

The contribution of the Adil Shahi kings to the architecture, painting, language, literature and music of Karnataka is unique. Bijapur (Kannada form of the Sanskrit Vidyapur or Vidyanagari) became a cosmopolitan city, and it attracted many scholars, artists, musicians, and Sufi saints from Turkey, Persia (Iran) Iraq, Turkey, Turkestan, etc.

The unfinished Jami Masjid, started in 1565, has an arcaded prayer hall with fine aisles supported on massive piers has an impressive dome. The Ibrahim Rouza which contains the tomb of Ibrahim Adil Shah II, is a fine structure with delicate carvings. Persian artists of Adil Shahi court have left a rare treasure of miniature paintings, some of which are well-preserved in Europe's great museums.

The Dakhani language, an amalgam of Persian-Arabic, Urdu, Marathi, and Kannada, developed into an independent spoken and literary language. Under the Adil Shahis many literary works were published in Dakhani. Ibrahim Adil Shah II's book of poems and music, Kitab-e-Navras is in Dakhani. The Mushaira (poetic symposium) was born in the Bijapur court and later travelled north. The Dakhani language, which was growing under the Bahamani kings, later came to be known as Dakhan Urdu to distinguish it from the North Indian Urdu. Adil Shah II played the sitar and ud and Ismail was a composer.

Adil Shahis of Bijapur

Yusuf Adil Shah (1490–1510)
Ismail Adil Shah (1510–1534)
Mallu Adil Shah (1534)
Ibrahim Adil Shah I (1534–1558)
Ali Adil Shah I (1558–1579)
Ibrahim Adil Shah II (1580–1627)
Mohammed Adil Shah (1627 – 4 November 1656); his mausoleum is the Gol Gumbaz, Bijapur
Ali Adil Shah II (1656 – 24 November 1672; his mother Khadija Sultana acted as regent until 1661)
Sikandar Adil Shah (1672 – 26 September 1686)

Asar Mahal

Muhammad Qasim Firishta wrote that in the year AH 1008, Mir Mohammed Swaleh Hamadani came to Bijapur. He had with him hair of the Muhammad ("Mooy-e-Mubarrak"). Sultan Ibrahim Adil shah heard of this and rejoiced.  Met Mir Swaleh Hamdani, the King saw the hair and gave priceless gifts to Mir Sahab.  Mir Sahab gave two strands of the hair to Sultan Ibrahim Adil Shah. At first, they were kept in Gagan Mahal, but during the reign of Adil Shah a huge fire burned down Gagan Mahal.  Everything there burnt up, except the two boxes in which two strands of hair were kept. In the midst of the conflagration, a Sufi Saint named Syed Saheb Mohiuddin braved the flames, entered and carried the boxes out on his head; the Sultan then kept these boxes in Asar Mahal. The custody of "Mooy-e-Mubarrak" has been given to the saint Noor Muhammad Mushraff issued by AdliShahi Diwan. Till today, the Original Sanad is with Mushrif family. Annual function is celebrated every year on 12th Rabi-ul-awwal (Sandal & Urs Asar Mahal). This function is held regularly since from more than 350 years.

It is said that in the year AH 1142 Adil Shah used to frequently view these strands of hair. On one occasion he asked all the Sufis of that time to come and see them. So Hashim Husaini and Sayyad Shah Murtuza Quadri came there and asked to open the boxes; they were opened in front of the noble persons.  But as they were opened a bright ray was everywhere. Nobody could bear the brightness of the ray and they all became unconscious. Everywhere there was a perfume and then everybody saw the hair. After that period it is said that the boxes were neither opened nor had a privilege.

See also

 Chand Bibi
List of Sunni dynasties
Bijapur Fort

Notes

References

Sources

 Devare, T. N. A short history of Persian literature; at the Bahmani, the Adilshahi, and the Qutbshahi courts.  Poona: S. Devare, 1961.

Further reading

Chapter on "Persian Literature in Bijapur Sultanate" in The Rise, Growth And Decline of Indo-Persian Literature by R.M. Chopra, Iran Culture House, New Delhi, 2012.

External links

The Adil Shahi Kingdom (1510 CE to 1686 CE) by Dr. (Mrs) Jyotsna Kamat

States and territories established in 1490
States and territories disestablished in 1686
 
Shia dynasties
Sultans of Bijapur
Sunni dynasties
History of Maharashtra

de:Adil Shahi